Wu Chinese has three major schools of romanization.

The most popular school, Common Wu Pinyin, was developed by amateur language clubs and local learners. There are two competing schemes; both adhere to the International Phonetic Alphabet (IPA) and are very similar to each other. The initial scheme was "Wu Chinese Society pinyin" (developed around 2005), and it formed the basis of "Wugniu pinyin" (around 2016).Wu Chinese Society pinyin in general does not mark tones. The name Wugniu comes from the Shanghainese pronunciation of 吴语. Either of them is the default romanization scheme in most learning materials.

The second school is the Latin Phonetic Method (French-Wu or Fawu []). Its use is in decline. It utilizes the similarities between French and Wu phonetics and thus adheres to both IPA and French orthography. It was developed in 2003 by a Shanghai-born surgeon based in Lyon, France.

The final, and least used school, adheres to Mandarin-Putonghua pinyin as sanctioned by the State Council. It is the only school developed by professional linguists, mostly working in state-administered universities. While more than 20 competing schemes within this school have been published since the 1980s, the most notable one is the Shanghainese Pinyin (often shortened to Qian's Pin [钱拼]), developed by Qian Nairong in 2006.

Comparison chart
All examples are given in Shanghainese and Suzhounese

Initials

Finals

Tones

References

Wu Chinese